The following articles include lists of salaries:

General 
 List of countries by average wage
 List of American countries by average wage
 List of European countries by average wage
 One-dollar salary
 The average salary in India in 2020.

Entertainment 
 List of highest paid American television stars
 List of highest paid film actors
 Screenwriter's salary

Government 
 List of salaries of heads of state and government
 Federal judge salaries in the United States
 MSPs' salaries, expenses and allowances
 Salary of Government Officials in India
 Salaries of Members of the United Kingdom Parliament
 Salaries of members of the United States Congress
 Salaries of elected offices in France

Sports 
 Forbes' list of world's highest-paid athletes
 Highest-paid NBA players by season
 List of highest paid Major League Baseball players
 List of largest sports contracts
 List of player salaries in the NHL

Other professions 
 Specialty (medicine)